Microcausta bipunctalis is a moth in the family Crambidae. It was described by William Barnes and James Halliday McDunnough in 1914. It is found in North America, where it has been recorded from Arizona.

References

Diptychophorini
Moths described in 1914